Jiří Švub (12 September 1958 – 19 August 2013) was a Czech cross-country skier. He competed in the men's 15 kilometre event at the 1980 Winter Olympics.

References

External links
 

1958 births
2013 deaths
Czech male cross-country skiers
Olympic cross-country skiers of Czechoslovakia
Cross-country skiers at the 1980 Winter Olympics
People from Jeseník
Sportspeople from the Olomouc Region